Tom Shuman (born November 9, 1953) is a former Canadian football quarterback in the Canadian Football League (CFL). He played for the Hamilton Tiger-Cats and Montreal Alouettes. He played college football at Penn State.

Shuman was the MVP of the 1974 Orange Bowl and 1975 Cotton Bowl Classic. He was drafted by the Cincinnati Bengals in the sixth round of the 1975 NFL Draft, but was released before the season.

References

1953 births
Living people
American football quarterbacks
Canadian football quarterbacks
Penn State Nittany Lions football players
Hamilton Tiger-Cats players
Montreal Alouettes players